Arthur Augustus "Ben" Egan (November 20, 1883 – February 18, 1968) was an American professional baseball catcher for the Philadelphia Athletics and Cleveland Indians from 1908 to 1915. He was later a coach for the Washington Senators for the first half of the 1924 season, the Brooklyn Dodgers in 1925, and the Chicago White Sox in 1926. Egan was Babe Ruth’s first catcher in professional baseball and went to the majors with Ruth when the two were sold to the Boston Red Sox.

References

External links

Find A Grave: Saint Helena’s Cemetery, Oneida, New York

1883 births
1968 deaths
Baltimore Orioles (IL) players
Baseball coaches from New York (state)
Baseball players from New York (state)
Brooklyn Dodgers coaches
Chicago White Sox coaches
Cleveland Naps players
Cleveland Indians players
Georgetown Hoyas baseball coaches
Haverhill Hustlers players
Jersey City Skeeters players
Major League Baseball catchers
Minor league baseball managers
Newark Bears (IL) players
Newark Indians players
Penn Yan players
People from Augusta, New York
Philadelphia Athletics players
Utica Pent-Ups players
Washington Senators (1901–1960) coaches

Find A Grave: Saint Helena’s Cemetery, Oneida, New York